Paul Michael Shardlow (29 April 1943 – 14 October 1968) was an English professional footballer who played as a goalkeeper for Stoke City. He also played cricket for Staffordshire.

Career

Football career
Shardlow was born in Stone, Staffordshire and began his career with Northwich Victoria before joining Stoke City in 1966 as understudy to John Farmer and Gordon Banks. He played twice for Stoke towards the end of 1966–67 and played twice again in 1967–68. Shardlow also spent two seasons in the NASL with the Cleveland Stokers. He was put in the reserves for the 1968–69 season before his death on 14 October 1968 at the age of 25.

Cricket career
Shardlow played cricket for Staffordshire as a wicket-keeper in the Minor Counties Championship between 1960 and 1966.

Death
Shardlow died on 14 October 1968 of a heart attack while on a training ground, at the age of 25. He was survived by his father, the cricketer Bertie Shardlow.

Career statistics

References

1943 births
1968 deaths
English footballers
Stoke City F.C. players
English Football League players
North American Soccer League (1968–1984) players
English cricketers
Staffordshire cricketers
People from Stone, Staffordshire
Cleveland Stokers players
Association football goalkeepers
English expatriate sportspeople in the United States
Expatriate soccer players in the United States
English expatriate footballers
Northwich Victoria F.C. players
Wicket-keepers
Association football players who died while playing
Sport deaths in England